Higgins is a rural small town in Lipscomb County, Texas, United States, named after G.H. Higgins, a stockholder in the Santa Fe Railroad. The population was 397 at the 2010 census.

Geography

Higgins is located at  (36.120027, –100.025597).

Demographics

As of the census of 2000, there were 425 people, 198 households, and 116 families residing in the city. The population density was 388.7 people per square mile (150.5/km2). There were 253 housing units at an average density of 231.4/sq mi (89.6/km2). The racial makeup of the city was 90.82% White, 0.94% African American, 2.59% Native American, 3.29% from other races, and 2.35% from two or more races. Hispanic or Latino of any race were 4.94% of the population.

There were 198 households, out of which 19.2% had children under the age of 18 living with them, 52.0% were married couples living together, 6.1% had a female householder with no husband present, and 41.4% were non-families. 38.4% of all households were made up of individuals, and 26.3% had someone living alone who was 65 years of age or older. The average household size was 2.15 and the average family size was 2.90.

In the city, the population was spread out, with 20.2% under the age of 18, 4.2% from 18 to 24, 18.6% from 25 to 44, 30.4% from 45 to 64, and 26.6% who were 65 years of age or older. The median age was 48 years. For every 100 females, there were 94.1 males. For every 100 females age 18 and over, there were 87.3 males.

The median income for a household in the city was $25,714, and the median income for a family was $32,875. Males had a median income of $17,917 versus $20,250 for females. The per capita income for the city was $16,164. About 17.8% of families and 21.1% of the population were below the poverty line, including 40.0% of those under age 18 and 16.0% of those age 65 or over.

Education
The City of Higgins is served by the Canadian Independent School District since July 1, 2020, when it absorbed the Higgins Independent School District.. The former operates Canadian High School, and the latter previously operated Higgins School.

Climate
According to the Köppen Climate Classification system, Higgins has a semi-arid climate, abbreviated "BSk" on climate maps.

References

Cities in Texas
Cities in Lipscomb County, Texas